Honoré Granier (16 May 1911 – 8 March 2001) was a French racing cyclist. He rode in the 1935 Tour de France.

References

1911 births
2001 deaths
French male cyclists
Place of birth missing